The Wild Jurchens or Haidong Jurchens were a group of the Jurchens as identified by the Ming Dynasty. They were the northernmost group of the Jurchen people (the other being the Jianzhou Jurchens and Haixi Jurchens). In the 14th century, they inhabited the northernmost part of Manchuria from the western side of the Greater Khingan mountains to the Ussuri River and the lower Amur River bordered by the Tatar Strait and the Sea of Japan.

The descendants of wild Jurchens do not identify themselves as Manchus. Instead, they formed different nations such as Nanai, Evenks, Negidals, Oroqen and Nivkh.

Etymology 
The Wild Jurchens, as their name suggests, lived in the wilds. The word Yeren (野人) in Chinese means "wild people," i.e. "savages." The Yeren had been a general name for all Jurchens before the rise of Jianzhou Jurchens and Haixi Jurchens. As vassals to Ming China, Jianzhou and Haixi became closer with their Chinese suzerain while the rest of Jurchens who did not establish constant connection with the Ming are known as the wild Jurchens.

See also 
List of Manchu clans
Sinicization of the Manchus

References

External links 
THE CAMBRIDGE HISTORY OF CHINA The Qing Empire To 1800 

Manchuria
Jurchen history